Jay Jones may refer to:

Jay Jones (American football), wide receiver for the Indiana Firebirds
Jay Jones (politician), member of the Virginia House of Delegates
Jay Jones, flute and sax player of The Blackbyrds